The Afterburner lighting kit by Triton Labs is an aftermarket modification to the Game Boy Advance in which a frontlight is installed into the unit. 

Afterburner is credited with helping Game Boy add a light element and after that happened, Afterburner was discontinued.

References

Lighting
Game Boy accessories
Game Boy Advance